The Energy Act 2013 is an Act of the Parliament of the United Kingdom, relating to the energy sector. It succeeded the Energy Act 2010. The Act focuses on setting decarbonisation targets for the UK, and reforming the electricity market. The Act was intended by Secretary of State for Energy and Climate Change Ed Davey to "attract investment to bring about a once-in-a-generation transformation of our electricity market".

History
The Energy Bill was introduced by the government in the House of Commons for first reading on 29 November 2012, and passed a vote at third reading with cross-party support on 4 June 2013. The Bill received Royal Assent on 18 December 2013.

Aims
The Act aims to maintain a stable electricity supply as coal-fired power stations are retired. This includes facilitating the building of a new set of nuclear power stations and the establishment of a new regulator, the Office for Nuclear Regulation.

The Act proposes a delay in setting decarbonisation targets under the Climate Change Act 2008, until 2016. Businesses and analysts have criticised the uncertainty this causes for investors, notably Balfour Beatty and Ernst & Young. Conservative MP Tim Yeo and Labour MP Barry Gardiner tabled amendments to the Bill to reinsert a 2030 decarbonisation target for the power sector by 2014.

The Act also enables the government to privatise the Government Pipelines and Storage System.

See also
Energy policy of the United Kingdom
Nuclear power in the United Kingdom

References

Energy policy of the United Kingdom
Energy in the United Kingdom
Climate change policy
Public policy in the United Kingdom
United Kingdom Acts of Parliament 2013
Energy law